Cyclononatetraene is an organic compound with the formula C9H10. It was first prepared in 1969 by protonation of the corresponding aromatic anion (described below).  It is unstable and isomerizes with a half-life of 50 minutes at room temperature to 3a,7a-dihydro-1H-indene via a thermal 6π disrotatory electrocyclic ring closing. Upon exposure to ultraviolet light, it undergoes a photochemical 8π electrocyclic ring closing to give bicyclo[6.1.0]nona-2,4,6-triene.

Cyclononatetraenyl anion 
Cyclononatetraenyl anion is a 10π aromatic system.  Two isomers of the cyclononatetraenyl anion are known: the trans,cis,cis,cis isomer ("Pac-Man"-shaped) and the all-cis isomer (a convex enneagon).  The former is less stable and isomerizes to the latter upon warming from –40 °C to room temperature.

The all-cis isomer of C9H9− can be prepared by treatment of 9-chlorobicyclo[6.1.0]nona-2,4,6-triene (1) with lithium or potassium metal.  Despite the ring strain resulting from having C–C–C bond angles of 140° instead of the ideal 120° for sp2 carbon, this species is believed to be planar and to possess D9h symmetry.  The lithium salt was found to be react with cyclopentadiene to give lithium cyclopentadienide, showing that cyclononatetraene is a weaker acid than cyclopentadiene.

Cyclononatetraenyl cation 

Cyclononatetraenyl cation is an 8π system.  Its intermediacy is implicated in the solvolysis of 1.  The facile solvolysis of 1 suggests that the cation is stabilized.  Computation and experimental evidence suggest that C9H9+ is a rare example of a ground state species that exhibits Möbius aromaticity.

See also
 Cyclopentadiene
 Cyclooctatetraene
 Cycloheptatriene
 Azonine

References

Cycloalkenes
Annulenes
Non-benzenoid aromatic carbocycles
Nine-membered rings